Catenulispora is a Gram-positive, rod-shaped and aerobic genus of bacteria.

References

Actinomycetia
Bacteria genera
Taxa described in 2006